Galbreath is a surname of Scottish origin meaning foreign Briton. Notable people with the surname include:

Asher A. Galbreath (1864–1935), American politician, educator, businessman
Charles Galbreath (1925–2013), American politician and jurist
Charles Burleigh Galbreath (1858–1934), American writer, historian, State Librarian of Ohio
Frank Galbreath (1913–1971), American jazz trumpeter
Harry Galbreath (born 1965), American professional football player
John W. Galbreath (1897–1988), American horseman and philanthropist
Louis H. Galbreath (1861–1899), American educator and football coach
Tony Galbreath (born 1954), American professional football player

See also
Galbraith

References

Surnames of Scottish origin